Michiko Hirai (平井 道子, Hirai Michiko, September 9, 1935 – July 3, 1984) was a Japanese actress and voice actress from Tokyo. She worked for Theater Echo. She is most known for originating the roles of Sally in Sally the Witch, Starsha in Star Blazers, and Ran in Ryu, the Cave Boy.

Life and Career
She has been active as an NHK exclusive singer since the age of 10. After graduating from Ferris Women's Junior College in Music Department, she was invited by Kazuo Kumakura to join Theater Echo in 1957. 

While she was acting for her theater company, she was also active as a voice actress dubbing Faye Dunaway and the role of Sally Yumeno in the TV anime Sally the Witch among many.

She was married to fellow voice actor Shinji Nakae. She was also a skilled singer and a Mahjong lover

She died at the age of 48 on July 3, 1984 at the Mishima Clinic in Koganei, Tokyo, due to heart failure. Her last works were Mrs Dracula in Lupin the 3rd Part III which was broadcast 4 days after her death, and the historical drama Onna goroshi abura no jigoku which was broadcast 2 months after her death.

Notable roles

Anime
Andersen Stories as Ming Ming (ep 11-12); Ball (ep 20); Helga (ep. 22-23); Little Mermaid (ep 31-33); Marte (ep 48); Evil Snow Queen (ep 50-51); Anna's Mother (ep 52)
Anne of Green Gables as Mrs. Evans
Casshan 
Devilman as Mermaim (ep 13)
Galaxy Express 999 as Queen Metamelina (ep 65)
God Mars as Aida
Golgo 13 as Catherine (voice)
Himitsu no Akko-chan as Shōshō Akatsuka (eps 56, 61)
Hoshi no Ko Chobin as Sagiri
Kikansha Yaemon D51 no Daibōken as Rinrin
Lupin III: Part II as Jasmine (ep 85); Melon Ganimard (ep 28)
Lupin III: Part III as Mrs Dracula (ep 11)
Lupin the 3rd as Ginko Hoshikage (ep 17); Maki / Rie Makita (ep 21); Rie Makita (ep 21)
Mahō no Mako-chan as Mama; Tomiko Tomita
München e no Michi
Nobara no Julie as Teresia
Nozomi in the Sun as Miki Kōda
The World of Hans Christian Andersen as Hans' Mother
Panda no Daibōken as Fifi
Reideen the Brave
Robokko Beeton as Nennen
Ryu, the Cave Boy as Ran
Sally the Witch (1966) as Sally
Sasuke as Sasuke's Mother
Space Battleship Yamato as Starsha
Space Battleship Yamato: The New Voyage as Starsha
Star Blazers as Starsha
Swiss Family Robinson as Anna
Under Sea Boy Marine
Yōkai Ningen Bem

Western animation
One Hundred and One Dalmatians as Cruella de Vil (1981 Dub)
Peanuts as Lucy Van Pelt
Snoopy Come Home as Lucy Van Pelt
Robin Hood as Lady Kluck (Theatrical release version)

Dubbing
Faye Dunaway
The Arrangement (NET Dub) 
Oklahoma Crude (TBS Dub)
Bonnie and Clyde (TV Asahi Dub)
The Thomas Crown Affair (TBS Dub)
Three Days of the Condor (TV Asahi Dub)
The Three Musketeers (TV Asahi Dub)
The Towering Inferno (TV Asahi Dub)
Little Big Man (TBS Dub)
The Champ (TV Asahi Dub)
Doc (TBS Dub)
The Four Musketeers (TV Asahi Dub)
Puzzle of a Downfall Child (TBS Dub)
Marlene Dietrich
Destry Rides Again (TV Asahi Dub)
Rita Hayworth
Blood and Sand
Judy Garland
A Star Is Born (TV Asahi Dub)
Claire Bloom
Alexander the Great (NET Dub)
Ursula Andress
Up to His Ears (TV Asahi Dub)
Catherine Deneuve
Mississippi Mermaid
Ros Spiers
The Man from Hong Kong
All Monsters Attack as Minira (voice)
Golgo 13 as Catherine (voice)
Kuchû toshi zero zero hachi as Oh-hara Tsukiko (voice)

Live action
Lone Wolf and Cub as Ohatsu (ep 3.14-16)
Onna goroshi abura no jigoku
Tooi sekkin

Theme song
"Itazura no Uta" Sally the Witch (2nd ending theme)

References

External links
Michiko Hirai at IMDb
Michiko Hirai at Anime News Network's encyclopedia

1935 births
1984 deaths
Japanese child actresses
Japanese voice actresses
Lupin the Third
Voice actresses from Tokyo
20th-century Japanese actresses